The  (AQL - Quebec Linguistic Society) is an academic organization devoted to the scientific study of human language, and is a  professional society for Francophone linguistic researchers in North America and beyond.

The AQL was formed in 1981.  The first executive was formed by Normand Beauchemin as president, Henri Wittmann as vice-president, and Robert Fournier as secretary-general.

Journal

The first editor of the journal was Henri Wittmann, under whose editorship, which extended over almost twenty years, the journal published some of the major research results on Quebec French. RQLTA is the only North-American research journal in linguistics that publishes its articles exclusively in French.

Annual conference
The AQL holds an annual linguistics conference every year on alternating campuses throughout Quebec and French Canada, usually in conjunction with ACFAS.

See also 

 Canadian French

Footnotes 

Linguistic societies
Organizations based in Quebec